The String Quartet No. 9 (D 173) in G minor was composed by Franz Schubert in 1815.

Movements
 Allegro con brio (G minor)
 Andantino (B-flat major)
 Menuetto: Allegro vivace (G minor, with Trio in B-flat major)
 Allegro (G minor)

Sources
 Franz Schubert's Works, Series V: Streichquartette edited by Joseph Hellmesberger and Eusebius Mandyczewski. Breitkopf & Härtel, 1890.
 Otto Erich Deutsch (and others). Schubert Thematic Catalogue (several editions), No. 173.
 New Schubert Edition, Series VI, Volume 4: String Quartets II edited by Werner Aderhold, Bärenreiter, 1994.

External links 
 

String Quartet No. 09
1815 compositions